The Barcelona Convention and Statute on the Regime of Navigable Waterways of International Concern is a multilateral treaty that was concluded at Barcelona on 20 April 1921. Its purpose is to ensure freedom of navigation in waterways (i.e. ports, rivers and artificial canals) which bear international significance. It was registered in League of Nations Treaty Series on 8 October 1921. It went into effect on 31 October 1922. The convention is still in force.

Terms of the convention
The convention merely reaffirmed the statute adopted the day before at a League of Nations conference held in Barcelona. Article 1 of the statute defined the term "navigable waterways of international concern" as any waterway that is connected to the sea and traversing through one or more sovereign states. Article 2 stated the convention shall also apply to waterways for which international commissions have been established. Article 3 obligated governments to allow free movement for in its waterways to vessels of any state whose government signed the convention. Article 4 required equal treatment for all nationalities in applying the freedom of navigation. Article 5 allowed some exceptions to the principles of freedom of navigation if a government chose to give priority to its own nationals in certain cases, conditional on the absence of any agreements to the contrary. Article 6 allowed governments to apply their rule of law in waterways under their control. Article 7 prohibited governments to levy any dues for passage in international waterways under their control, except for minimal dues necessary for the maintenance of the said above waterways. Article 8 prohibited governments from levying customs for goods passing through their territories, and stated that the principles of the Barcelona Convention and Statute on Freedom of Transit shall also apply to maritime navigation. Article 9 obligated governments to grant equal treatment to all foreign nationals in using their ports, with some exceptions. Article 10 obligated the governments controlling waterways to maintain them regularly to allow smooth navigation.

Article 11 dealt with states non signatory of the convention and their rights of use of the waterways. Article 12 stated that in case a waterway is divided between two or more states, the responsibility for the rule of law shall be divided according to territorial division of the waterway itself. Article 13 stated that previously signed agreements on navigation shall remain in force, but requested the governments involved not to implement provisions of such treaties if they conflicted with the convention. Article 14 regulated the work of international navigation commissions. Article 15 allowed exceptions in time of war. Article 16 stated that none of the statute's provisions shall conflict with obligations under the Covenant of the League of Nations. Article 17 stated the statute did not apply to war or police vessels. Article 18 prohibited governments to make navigation arrangements that were in conflict with the statute or convention. Article 19 allowed to make exceptions in times of national emergency. Article 20 allowed governments to grant greater freedom of navigation that provided for in the statute, if they chose to do so.

Article 21 allowed governments to make exceptions in implementation of freedom of navigation, in cases of part or all of their waterways were still affected by destruction caused during the First World War.
Article 22 provided for resolution of disputes regarding interpretation through the Permanent Court of International Justice.
Article 23 allowed governments to exempt from freedom of navigation waterways or parts of them passing through under-populated or otherwise problematic areas under their control.
Article 24 exempted waterways that are lying between two states and not being necessary for the passage into a third state that was non signatory of the convention. Article 25 stated that different arrangements shall apply in League of Nations mandated territories.

See also
 Barcelona Convention and Statute on Freedom of Transit
 Convention and Statute on the International Régime of Maritime Ports
 Declaration recognising the Right to a Flag of States having no Sea-coast

Notes

External links
 text of the Convention
 text of convention
 Ratifications and status
 study on legal regime of international waterways

Treaties concluded in 1921
Treaties entered into force in 1922
League of Nations treaties
Treaties of the Principality of Albania
Treaties of the First Austrian Republic
Treaties of the United Kingdom (1801–1922)
Treaties extended to New Zealand
Treaties extended to British India
Treaties of the Kingdom of Bulgaria
Treaties of Chile
Treaties of Czechoslovakia
Treaties of Denmark
Treaties of Finland
Treaties of the French Third Republic
Treaties of the Kingdom of Greece
Treaties of the Kingdom of Hungary (1920–1946)
Treaties of the Kingdom of Italy (1861–1946)
Treaties of Luxembourg
Treaties of Norway
Treaties of the Kingdom of Romania
Treaties of Sweden
Treaties of Thailand
Treaties of Turkey
Treaties of Antigua and Barbuda
Treaties of Fiji
Treaties of the Khmer Republic
Treaties of Malta
Treaties of Morocco
Treaties of Nigeria
Treaties of Slovakia
Treaties of the Solomon Islands
Treaties of Eswatini
Treaties of Zimbabwe
Treaties of Saint Vincent and the Grenadines
1921 in Spain
Water treaties
Transport treaties

Treaties extended to the Faroe Islands
Treaties extended to Greenland
Treaties extended to the Dominion of Newfoundland
Treaties extended to the Federated Malay States
Treaties extended to the Unfederated Malay States
Treaties extended to Mandatory Palestine
Treaties extended to Nyasaland
Treaties extended to the British Leeward Islands
Treaties extended to the British Windward Islands
Treaties extended to British Dominica
Treaties extended to the Colony of the Bahamas
Treaties extended to the Colony of Barbados
Treaties extended to the Crown Colony of Seychelles
Treaties extended to the Crown Colony of Trinidad and Tobago
Treaties extended to British Cyprus
Treaties extended to Basutoland
Treaties extended to the Bechuanaland Protectorate
Treaties extended to Bermuda
Treaties extended to British Burma
Treaties extended to British Ceylon
Treaties extended to the Gambia Colony and Protectorate
Treaties extended to British Honduras
Treaties extended to British Mauritius
Treaties extended to the British Solomon Islands
Treaties extended to British Somaliland
Treaties extended to Brunei (protectorate)
Treaties extended to the Falkland Islands
Treaties extended to the Colony of Fiji
Treaties extended to Gibraltar
Treaties extended to the Gilbert and Ellice Islands
Treaties extended to the Gold Coast (British colony)
Treaties extended to Guernsey
Treaties extended to the Isle of Man
Treaties extended to Jersey
Treaties extended to the Colony of Jamaica
Treaties extended to British Kenya
Treaties extended to the Crown Colony of Malta
Treaties extended to the New Hebrides
Treaties extended to the Colony and Protectorate of Nigeria
Treaties extended to the Pitcairn Islands
Treaties extended to Saint Helena, Ascension and Tristan da Cunha
Treaties extended to the Colony of Sierra Leone
Treaties extended to South Georgia and the South Sandwich Islands
Treaties extended to the Straits Settlements
Treaties extended to Swaziland (protectorate)
Treaties extended to Tanganyika (territory)
Treaties extended to the Kingdom of Tonga (1900–1970)
Treaties extended to the Emirate of Transjordan
Treaties extended to the Uganda Protectorate
Treaties extended to the Sultanate of Zanzibar
Treaties extended to British Hong Kong
Admiralty law treaties
Treaties extended to British Cameroon
Treaties extended to British Togoland